Daniel or Dan Jorgensen may refer to:
Daniel Jørgensen (born 1993), Danish track and field athlete and snowboarder
Dan Jørgensen (born 1975), Danish politician
Dan Jorgensen (swimmer) (born 1968), retired American swimmer